Sarah Gigante (born 6 October 2000) is an Australian racing cyclist, who currently rides for UCI Women's WorldTeam .

Career

Junior and under-23 career
In 2018, Gigante was national junior champion in the road race, individual time trial and criterium, won the junior women's road race at the 2018 Oceania Cycling Championships, won the silver medal in the Junior World Track Championships points race,

In 2019, aged 18, Gigante won the elite women's race at the Australian National Road Race Championships. She was awarded the 2019 Amy Gillett Foundation Scholarship to support her development as a professional cyclist.

Tibco–Silicon Valley Bank (2020–2021)
In December 2019, it was announced that Gigante would turn professional with the  team. In January 2020, she won the Australian National Time Trial Championships. She won the overall at the Australian National Road Series. She re-signed with Tibco-SVB for the 2021 season.

Gigante finished second in the inaugural UCI Cycling Esports World Championships.

She had a strong start to the 2021 season in Australia winning the general classification and two stages at the Santos Festival of Cycling. She then defended her national title in the individual time trial.  

Gigante was selected to compete in the road race and time trial at the Tokyo Olympics. She finished 40th in the road race and 11th in the time trial.

Movistar (2022)
Gigante had her first win in Europe at the Emakumeen Nafarroako Klasikoa.

Personal
In 2018, Gigante achieved a perfect high school Australian Tertiary Admission Rank (ATAR) score of 99.95, earning her the prestigious University of Melbourne Chancellor's Scholarship. She is studying a double degree in linguistics and geography.

Major results

2017
 2nd  Road race, Oceania Junior Road Championships
 National Junior Road Championships
2nd  Road race
3rd  Criterium
2018
 1st  Road race, Oceania Junior Road Championships
 National Junior Road Championships
1st  Road race
1st  Time trial
1st  Criterium
 National Junior Track Championships
1st  Team pursuit
1st  Points race
1st  Madison
 2nd  Points race, UCI Junior Track Cycling World Championships
2019
 Oceania Road Championships
1st  Under-23 road race
1st  Under-23 time trial
2nd  Road race
 National Road Championships
1st  Road race
1st  Under-23 road race
1st  Under-23 time trial
 1st  Overall Spirit of Tasmania Cycling Tour
1st Stage 1
2020
 National Road Championships
1st  Time trial
2nd  Under-23 road race
 1st Overall National Road Series
 2nd  UCI Esports World Championships
 5th Overall Women's Herald Sun Tour
2021
 National Road Championships
1st  Time trial
 1st  Overall Santos Festival of Cycling
1st  Mountains classification
1st  Young rider classification
1st Stages 2 & 3
2022
 1st Emakumeen Nafarroako Klasikoa

References

External links

2000 births
Living people
Australian female cyclists
Olympic cyclists of Australia
Cyclists at the 2020 Summer Olympics
21st-century Australian women